The 2004–05 BSC Young Boys season was the club's 107th season in existence and the club's fourth consecutive season in the top flight of Swiss football. In addition to the domestic league, Young Boys participated in this season's editions of the Swiss Cup and the UEFA Champions League.

Pre-season and friendlies

During pre-season, the team competed in the Burkhalter Cup, winning both games to claim the title.

Competitions

Overall record

Swiss Super League 

Note: It should be mentioned that Young Boys and Servette were scheduled to play two matches, but they were canceled after Servette withdrew from the league at the conclusion of the first round.

League table

Results summary

Results by round

Matches 

Source:

Swiss Cup

UEFA Champions League

Second qualifying round

References

External links

BSC Young Boys seasons
Young Boys